Edgar Ferdinand Cyriax (February 28, 1874 - February 19, 1955) was an English-Swedish orthopedic physician and physiotherapist from London, England. He is known for his work in gymnastics, manipulative treatment, and for the first written description of slipping rib syndrome.

Biography 
Edgar Ferdinand Cyriax was born in London, England on February 28, 1874, to Julius Friedrich Theodor Cyriax and Anna Lina Antonia Romana Eckenstein.

In 1899 Cyriax married Annjuta (Anna) Kellgren, daughter of Jonas Henrik Kellgren, Cyriax's mentor. Together they had James Cyriax, Anna Violet Cyriax and Mary Elizabeth Cyriax.

Cyriax obtained his medical degree at Edinburgh University in 1901, then later graduated from the Kungliga Gymnastika Central Institut in Stockholm, Sweden.

He founded the North American Academy of Manipulative Medicine together with James Mennell. The first written description of slipping rib syndrome was described by Cyriax in 1919, who called it "Cyriax syndrome".

He was 80 years old when he died on February 19, 1955, in London, England. After his death, Cyriax's collection of notes, writings, and journals of gymnastics and manipulative treatment were donated to the Wellcome Library by his family.

Bibliography 

 The elements of Kellgrens Manual Treatment. New York: W. Wood and Co., 1904.
 Bibliographia gymnastica medica. 1909.
 Some new facts in the anatomy of certain movements. Journal of Anatomy, London, 1917, 51: 396-399.
 On various conditions that may simulate the referred pains of visceral disease, and a consideration of these from the point of view of cause and effect. 1919, 102: 314-322.
 On "Concentrating" and "Centrifugal" Vibrations. 1920, 93(4): 165-171.
 On the rotary movement of the wrist. Journal of Anatomy, 1926, 60: 199-201. PMCID: PMC5925686
 Minor displacements of the sacro-iliac joints. The British Journal of Physical Medicine, London, 1934, 8: 191-193.

References 

1874 births
1955 deaths
People from London